Werner Zwimpfer (born 21 April 1944) is a Swiss rower. He competed with Fred Rüssli in the men's coxless pair event at the 1968 Summer Olympics. The pair came 5th in the final with a time of 7.46.79.

References

External links
 

1944 births
Living people
Swiss male rowers
Olympic rowers of Switzerland
Rowers at the 1968 Summer Olympics
Sportspeople from Lucerne